Marrie Wieczorek is an English former football manager and player. Her greatest achievement was reaching the 1982 WFA Cup Final. After retiring from football Wieczorek became a football coach.

Playing career
Wieczorek was a founding member of Cleveland Spartans. She played in the 1982 WFA Cup Final.

International career
Wieczorek made her debut for England on 1 May 1980, in a 2–1 loss to Belgium. She made two more appearances for England, first in a 6–1 win against Wales on 1 June 1980, and a 1–1 draw against Sweden on 17 September 1980.

Managerial career
In 1996 Wieczorek was appointed manager of Middlesbrough Women. Under her guidance Middlesbrough won the 2001–02 Northern Combination. The club spent four seasons in the FA Women's Premier League Northern Division, before relegation at the end of the 2005–06 season. Wieczorek remained in charge of Middlesbrough until 2013.

Personal life
Marrie Wieczorek is of polish descent.

Honours

Manager
Middlesbrough Women
Northern Combination Women's Football League: 2001–02

References

Living people
English women's footballers
Women's association football defenders
England women's international footballers
English people of Polish descent
Middlesbrough W.F.C. players
English women's football managers
Year of birth missing (living people)